Antonis Gaitanidis (born 18 March 2000) is a Greek professional footballer who plays as a forward.

Career

Early career
Antonis Gaitanidis came from Ioannina to PAOK in 2014 and then settled in the PAOK Academy House. In his first year at the club he was crowned champion with the Under-15s with 13 goals and five assists in 18 games. In his second season he was crowned a champion with the Under-17s with four goals and three assists. He won two championships with the Under-19s posting excellent stats in the 2018-19 season, when he scored 18 goals and provided an equal number of assists. He is of course a youth international. He is a left winger, but can also operate on the right wing. With pace and capable of beating players one-on-one, he is a player who also knows how to assist and to score. He trained with the first team in the pre-season of 2019, even scoring three goals in friendlies against Nordsjælland, Cluj and Anderlecht. In the process, he was loaned to Apollon and Levadiakos.

References

2000 births
Living people
Greek footballers
Greece under-21 international footballers
Greece youth international footballers
Super League Greece players
Super League Greece 2 players
PAOK FC players
Apollon Smyrnis F.C. players
Levadiakos F.C. players
1. FC Tatran Prešov players
2. Liga (Slovakia) players
Expatriate footballers in Slovakia
Greek expatriate sportspeople in Slovakia
Association football forwards
Footballers from Ioannina